Pirita JK Reliikvia is a football club based in Pirita, Tallinn, Estonia. Founded in 2007, it currently plays in III Liiga.

Players

Current squad

 ''As of 24 July 2019

Statistics

League and Cup

References

External links
 
 Team at Estonian Football Association

Harju County
Football clubs in Estonia
Association football clubs established in 2007